Heather Barbara Samuel (born 6 July 1970) is a retired sprinter from Antigua and Barbuda who specialized in the 100 and 200 metres. In 1990 she won two medals at the Central American and Caribbean Games with a silver medal in the 100 metres and a bronze medal in the 200 metres.

Samuel was a sprinter/jumper at Murray State University in Murray, Kentucky from 1991 to 1994; in 2004 she was selected for the Murray State Athletics Hall of Fame.  Her World Championships debut came in 1993, when she competed in 100 and 200 m at the 1993 World Championships. She did not reach the final in either event. In May that year she had achieved a career best time over the 100 m, clocking 11.20 seconds in Indianapolis. In May the next year she clocked a career best time of 23.20 over 200 metres in Atlanta.

In 1995 she became Central American and Caribbean Champion for the only time. She again competed in two events at the World Championships, again without reaching the final, and repeated this at the 1997 World Championships.

In 1999 she made her debut at the World Indoor Championships, and only competed in the 100 metres at the World Championships the same year. She competed in the 100 m as well as her last world-level 200 m at the 2000 Summer Olympics, and in the 60 m at the 2001 World Indoor Championships, again without reaching the final round. However, she repeated her success from 1990 at the Central American and Caribbean Games, once again winning a silver and a bronze medal.

In 2003, she reached the 60 m semi-final at the 2003 World Indoor Championships, which was her best result in a global athletics event. Unsuccessful participations at the 2003 World Championships and the 2004 Summer Olympics followed. She has not competed since 2004.

Achievements

References

External links
 
 
 

1970 births
Living people
Antigua and Barbuda female sprinters
Athletes (track and field) at the 1994 Commonwealth Games
Athletes (track and field) at the 1998 Commonwealth Games
Athletes (track and field) at the 2002 Commonwealth Games
Athletes (track and field) at the 1995 Pan American Games
Athletes (track and field) at the 1999 Pan American Games
Athletes (track and field) at the 2003 Pan American Games
Athletes (track and field) at the 1992 Summer Olympics
Athletes (track and field) at the 1996 Summer Olympics
Athletes (track and field) at the 2000 Summer Olympics
Athletes (track and field) at the 2004 Summer Olympics
Olympic athletes of Antigua and Barbuda
Murray State University alumni
Commonwealth Games competitors for Antigua and Barbuda
Pan American Games bronze medalists for Antigua and Barbuda
Pan American Games medalists in athletics (track and field)
Central American and Caribbean Games silver medalists for Antigua and Barbuda
Central American and Caribbean Games bronze medalists for Antigua and Barbuda
Competitors at the 2002 Central American and Caribbean Games
Central American and Caribbean Games medalists in athletics
Medalists at the 1995 Pan American Games
Olympic female sprinters